Elsie Paul is an Elder and knowledge keeper of the Tla'amin (Sliammon) Nation, located on the Sunshine Coast of British Columbia, Canada. Paul is a residential school survivor and one of the few living people to speak the Tla'amin language fluently. Paul holds an honorary Doctorate degree from the Vancouver Island University and has co-authored a book, Written as I Remember it: Teachings From the Life of a Sliammon Elder. This work was later released in an open access, multimedia, digital edition.

Early life 
Elsie Paul (née Timothy) was born in 1931 in the Tla'amin Nation to parents, Gilbert Francis and Lily Timothy.  Paul was later adopted by her maternal grandparents, Jim and Molly Timothy, who raised her in Tla'amin Nation.  Elsie survived 2 years of residential school and was then protected by her grandparents who moved her along the coast of British Columbia in order to avoid residential school.  Paul's experiences avoiding residential school provided the opportunity to learn the traditional knowledge, skills, language, and customs of the Tla'amin Nation; an uncommon experience for Indigenous children and people at that time.  At the age of 18 Elsie Timothy married William Dave Paul and took the last name Paul.  Elsie and William Paul had 9 children together, Sharon (deceased), Jane (Deceased) Glen, Jeannie, Walter, Ann, Cathy, Marlane, and Clifford (Deceased) and were married until William's death in 1977.

Education 
Paul completed her grade 10 level of schooling as well as upgrading and finally her certification as a Social Worker from the University of British Columbia.  She received an Honorary Doctorate degree from Vancouver Island University in 2009, recognizing her longstanding work for her communities.

Work 
Before beginning her career as a Social Worker, Elsie travelled the province doing a variety of jobs from working on fish farms, to housekeeping in the hospital, and shucking oysters.

In 1972 Elsie Paul took over the position of Administrator in the Social Services Department in Tla'amin, she worked there for 24 years.  She was one of the founders of the Tsow-Tun-Lelum House Treatment Centre, a Healing Lodge specializing in substance abuse, trauma, and support for survivors of residential schools, she served as Justice of the Peace in Victim Support Services and Aboriginal Policing, and she also taught part-time at Malaspina College.

Paul was also elected to her Band Council and served with them until her retirement in 1999.

Language 
Elsie Paul is one of the few fluent speakers of the Tla'amin language, a language that has been identified as a Central Salish branch of Coast Salish languages.  Paul has worked to help develop the Tla'amin language curriculum that is now used in School District 47 (Powell River and Texada Island, British Columbia, Canada).  Paul also worked with the Tla'amin Cultural Department to aid in developing a language program for her community as well as the FirstVoices database, where Indigenous languages are recorded, archived, and revived.

Awards 

 In 2017 the City of Powell River granted Elsie Paul the Freedom of the City and commended her for her "Unfailing grace and steadfast and kind demeanour".  
 Written as I Remember it: Teachings from the Life of a Sliammon Elder (a book co-authored by Elsie Paul) won the following awards:  2015, Winner - Aboriginal History Book Prize, Canadian Historical Association  2015, Winner - Armitage-Jameson Book Prize, Coalition for Western Women's History  2015, Commended - BCHF Historical Writing Awards, British Columbia Historical Federation.
 Honorary Doctorate in 2010 from Vancouver Island University.

References 

1931 births
Living people
20th-century First Nations people
21st-century First Nations people
Coast Salish people
University of British Columbia alumni
Canadian social workers
Vancouver Island University
First Nations women